Quri Daraq (also Romanized as Qūrī Daraq) is a village in Angut-e Gharbi Rural District, Anguti District, Germi County, Ardabil Province, Iran. At the 2006 census, its population was 65, in 16 families.

References 

Towns and villages in Germi County